Cohors tertia Alpinorum equitata ("3rd part-mounted Cohort of Alpini") was a Roman auxiliary mixed infantry and cavalry regiment. Alpini was a generic name denoting several Celtic-speaking mountain tribes inhabiting the Alps between Italy and Gaul, which were organised as the Tres Alpes provinces.

The regiment was probably raised as one of 4–6 Alpini units recruited after the final annexation of the western Alpine regions by emperor Augustus in 15 BC. It first appears in the datable epigraphic record in Dalmatia in 75 AD. It was still in Dalmatia in 93. It probably remained there for the whole of the 2nd century and moved to Pannonia in the early 3rd century. However, in the absence of datable inscriptions, movements after 93 are speculative. The regiment's inscriptions have been found at the following Roman forts (in likely order of occupation): Humac; Burnum; Salona; Muć; Baratsföldpuszta (Pannonia).

The names of five praefecti (regimental commanders) are preserved (none has a certain origin); four centuriones (infantry officers), and two decuriones (cavalry officers) are recorded, although only one has a certain origin (Celeia, Slovenia). Junior officers attested are a signifer (standard-bearer), tesserarius (watch officer) and a tubicen (trumpeter). Of these only the tubicen s origin is known: the Caturiges, a tribe in the Gallic Alps. The names of 13 caligati (common soldiers) are extant. One is of the Bodionti, probably a Gallic tribe. Another is from the Alpes Maritimae province, where the regiment was originally (partially) recruited.

See also 
 Roman auxiliaries
 List of Roman auxiliary regiments

Citations

References 
 Holder, Paul Studies in the Auxilia of the Roman Army (1980)
 Spaul, John COHORS 2 (2000)

Military of ancient Rome
Auxiliary equitata units of ancient Rome